Taymyr Autonomous Okrug was a federal subject of Russia until December 31, 2006.  On January 1, 2007, it was merged into Krasnoyarsk Krai along with Evenk Autonomous Okrug.  During the transitional period it retains a special status within Krasnoyarsk Krai.

Towns under the autonomous okrug's jurisdiction:
Dudinka (Дудинка) (administrative center)
with 6 selsovets under the town's jurisdiction.
Districts:
Diksonsky (Диксонский)
Urban-type settlements under the district's jurisdiction:
Dikson (Диксон)
Khatangsky (Хатангский)
with 10 selsovets under the district's jurisdiction.
Ust-Yeniseysky (Усть-Енисейский)
with 5 selsovets under the district's jurisdiction.
Dudinsky (Дудинский)

See also
Administrative divisions of Krasnoyarsk Krai
Administrative divisions of Evenk Autonomous Okrug

References

Krasnoyarsk Krai
Taymyr Autonomous Okrug